This is a list of electoral district results for the 1947 general election for the Northern Territory Legislative Council in Australia.

Results by electoral district

Alice Springs

Batchelor

Darwin

|- style="background-color:#E9E9E9"
! colspan="6" style="text-align:left;" |After first distribution of preferences

|- style="background-color:#E9E9E9"
! colspan="6" style="text-align:left;" |After second distribution of preferences

Stuart

Tennant Creek

References

Results of Northern Territory elections